Eulaceura is a genus of butterflies in the family Nymphalidae and subfamily 
Apaturinae.

The genus contains two species:
Eulaceura manipuriensis Tytler, 1915 – Tytler's emperor – Manipur, Indochina
Eulaceura osteria (Westwood, 1850)
E. o. osteria Java, Borneo, Malaya
E. o. kumana Fruhstorfer, 1913 Peninsular Malaya, Singapore
E. o. nicomedeia Fruhstorfer Sumatra
E. o. jembala Fruhstorfer Borneo
E. o. bipupillata Lathy Nias
E. o. sitarama Fruhstorfer Hainan
E. o. tanahmasa Hanafusa, 1996 Indonesia, Batu Islands, Tanahmasa Island
E. o. nakamotoi Miyata & Hanafusa, 1989 Indonesia, Belitung Island
E. o. baraena Corbet, 1942 Mentawi Island

External links
"Eulaceura Butler, [1872]" at Markku Savela's Lepidoptera and Some Other Life Forms

Apaturinae
Nymphalidae genera
Taxa named by Arthur Gardiner Butler